Epiphany in literature refers generally to a visionary moment when a character has a sudden insight or realization that changes their understanding of themselves or their comprehension of the world. The term has a more specialized sense as a literary device distinct to modernist fiction. Author James Joyce first borrowed the religious term "Epiphany" and adopted it into a profane literary context in Stephen Hero (1904-1906), an early version of A Portrait of the Artist as a Young Man. In that manuscript, Stephen Daedalus defines epiphany as "a sudden spiritual manifestation, whether in the vulgarity of speech or of gesture or in a memorable phase of the mind itself." Stephen's epiphanies are moments of heightened poetic perception in the trivial aspects of everyday Dublin life, non-religious and non-mystical in nature. They become the basis of Stephen's theory of aesthetic perception as well as his writing. In similar terms, Joyce experimented with epiphany throughout his career, from the short stories he wrote between 1898 and 1904 which were central to his early work, to his late novel Finnegans Wake (1939). Scholars used Joyce's term to describe a common feature of the modernist novel, with authors as varied as Virginia Woolf, Marcel Proust, Ezra Pound, and Katherine Mansfield all featuring these sudden moments of vision as an aspect of the contemporary mind. Joycean or modernist epiphany has its roots in nineteenth-century lyric poetry, especially the Wordsworthian "spots of time," as well as the sudden spiritual insights that formed the basis of traditional spiritual autobiography. Philosopher Charles Taylor explains the rise of epiphany in modernist art as a reaction against the rise of a “commercial-industrial-capitalist society” during the early twentieth century.

Etymology 
The word "epiphany" descends from the ancient Greek ἐπῐφᾰ́νειᾰ (epipháneia), meaning a "manifestation or appearance." The word is built from the Greek words "pha" (to shine), "phanein" (to show, to cause to shine), and "epiphanein" (to manifest, to bring to light). In ancient Greek usage, the term often describes the visible manifestation of a god or goddess to mortal eyes, a form of theophany. Early Christians adopted the term to describe the manifestation of the child, Jesus to the Magi, which was understood figuratively as the revelation of Christ to the Gentiles and commemorated in the Catholic Feast of Epiphany, celebrated January 6. In the Greek New Testament manuscripts, epiphaneia refers also to Christ's second coming.

Epiphanies in Dubliners 

Dubliners by James Joyce is a collection of short stories published in June 1914. The short stories, set in Dublin, capture some of the most unhappy moments in life.  Dublin, to Joyce, seemed to be the centre of paralysis, which he explains in a letter to Grant Richards, who was the publisher of Dubliners. Joyce explains his purpose and intention behind writing the collection:"My intention was to write a chapter of the moral history of my country and I chose Dublin for the scene because that city seemed to me the centre of paralysis. I have tried to present it to the indifferent public under four of its aspects: childhood, adolescence, maturity, and public life. The stories are arranged in this order. I have written it for the most part in a style of scrupulous meanness and with the conviction that he is a very bold man who dares to alter in the presentment, still more to deform, whatever he has seen and heard."Epiphanies are a main literary device employed within the fifteen short stories in Dubliners and tend to circulate around moments of realisation of despair and disillusionment. Epiphanies employed by Joyce are often described as "a sudden spiritual manifestation, whether from some object, scene, event, or memorable phase of the mind — the manifestation being out of proportion to the significance or strictly logical relevance of whatever produces it." The epiphanies in Dubliners in particular follow a common theme of loss and regret that are intertwined with death and despair that emerge from Joyce's very own childhood in Ireland. Epiphanies as a structural tool in Dubliners helps bring the narrative to a climax as the epiphany is formed throughout the story through the protagonist's pain and reflection upon their experiences.

Araby 
Araby is the third short story in Dubliners that centres around the narrator recollecting on an experience of when he was a young boy where he experienced a moment of epiphanic disillusionment. The story narrates in first person a young boy who is infatuated with a girl who remains unnamed and is referred to as, "Mangan's sister." The narrator is infatuated with her even though he has never truly spoken to her, yet he claims that her name was, "like a summons to all my foolish blood." When the narrator learns of how Mangan's sister wishes to go to Araby, which is a bazaar that she cannot go to due to other religious obligations the narrator believes that if he can bring her back a gift that she would return his feelings. However, when the time came to go to the bazaar the narrator is delayed because he needs his uncle to lend him some money although the uncle forgot about it and so the narrator heads out late to the bazaar.

Upon arrival at the bazaar, most of the stalls are closed as he is late. The narrator is confronted by what he is seeing in front of him and he turns away from Araby after his vision and expectations of it are destroyed with the banal reality of it that is presented to him. In turn, he becomes disillusioned with his idealisation of Mangan's sister as well. In the last sentence this notion is captured: "Gazing up into the darkness I saw myself as a creature driven and derided by vanity, and my eyes burned with anguish and anger" where his realisation becomes an epiphanic moment. He now views the world differently as he now realises his own vanity and stupidity as he now has more self-awareness of himself.

Eveline 
Eveline centres around the character of the same name who has been given a chance to escape her life with a man called Frank who is in love with her, however, Eveline's family is the cause of her paralysis. Her mother and brother have died, one of her brothers is always away and her father is an abusive drunkard. It could be assumed that her father's nature would provide a greater reason for her to leave but when the opportunity arises for her to escape she simply cannot as she states that "it was impossible" as she realises her situation. Eveline feels with Frank that, "all the seas of the world tumbled about her heart. He was drawing her into them: he would drown her. She gripped with both hands at the iron railing...No! No! No! It was impossible. Her hands clutched the iron in frenzy. Amid the seas, she sent a cry of anguish." This is Eveline's epiphany that she cannot escape even though she wanted to she cannot leave behind her familial ties.

A Little Cloud 
A Little Cloud is a part of the Dubliners short story collection centering around the protagonist, Little Chandler who reunites with an old friend, Ignatius Gallaher who is a more worldly man than himself. Little Chandler wishes to change his life, but the harsh reality of Dublin intrudes upon his hopes and in his moment of epiphany when he realises that it is useless to try to change his reality. Little Chandler's first epiphany begins when he reunites with Gallaher who is successful in the world after he left Dublin. During this conversation between the two men is when Little Chandler realises and starts to believe that the only way to be successful in life is to leave Dublin. Little Chandler then returns home to a house full of hate and regret where his wife controls him and he does not love her and who made him give up what he does love - poetry.

Upon his return home, he looks into a photograph of his wife as he looks, "coldly into the eyes of the photograph and they answered coldly," back to him. He feels a deep rush of despair and regret for marrying his wife as he realises that, "dull resentment against his life awoke within him." His child begins to cry and wail whilst Little Chandler was pondering his life and he finds he does not know what to do to make the child stop. The wife eventually rushes in and scolds Little Chandler: "'What have you done to him?" This is when the final epiphany starts to form itself as he looks into her eyes and his "heart closed together" upon gazing into her cold eyes. The last sentence capsulises the epiphany as, "Little Chandler felt his cheeks suffused with shame and he stood back out of the lamplight. He listened while the paroxysm of the child's sobbing grew less and less; and tears of remorse started to his eyes." The tears of remorse that begin to fill up his eyes are symbolic of his emotion of regret for his life and the uselessness he feels in never being able to change the trajectory of his life in the way that he wants.

The Dead 
The short story "The Dead" expresses the paralysis of the epiphany Joyce’s character Gabriel experiences in discovering his wife’s grief over her first love. The line "It hardly pained him now to think how poor a part he, her husband, had played in her life," provides a tonal shift from Gabriel lusting after his wife to being dumbstruck by the realisation that he may not be enough for his wife. When Gretta (wife) listens to D’Arcy singing "The Lass of Aughrim", she is reminded of her first love’s death. Gabriel realises that while he has been lusting after her she has been comparing him to another man. This section of the story is influenced by Joyce’s love of Irish music.

William Wordsworth's "Spots of time" 
William Wordsworth was a Romantic poet in the 1800s. He became renowned through his collaboration with Samuel Taylor Coleridge on the collection of poems titled the Lyrical Ballads. In Wordsworth's time, epiphanies had not yet been given that term and were referred to by Wordsworth as "spots of time." There is an agreement that the modern term for the literature device "epiphany" began with Romanticism and in particular with the works of William Wordsworth. Wordsworth's innovation of "spots of time" in his poems have affected modern fiction and the modern short story.

The Prelude 
The main plot points of The Prelude center upon the exploration of epiphany, which Wordsworth presents as vital to the history of his imagination. Two central themes to The Prelude are of childhood and memory and the adventures that Wordsworth has had as a child in the Lake District. These childhood memories, recollected in adulthood, include epiphanies that Wordsworth refers to as "spots of time."

Book Twelve of The Prelude: Imagination and Taste, How Impaired and Restored 
In the twelfth book of The Prelude, Wordsworth in his poem elaborates on the experience of the rejuvenating virtue that is given to him through his epiphanic moments that he recalls from childhood experience. "There are in our existence spots of time,/ That with distinct pre-eminence retain,/ A renovating virtue, whence--depressed/ By false opinion and contentious thought,/ Or aught of heavier or more deadly weight,/ In trivial occupations, and the round/ Of ordinary intercourse--our minds/ Are nourished and invisibly repaired;/ A virtue, by which pleasure is enhanced,/ That penetrates, enables us to mount,/ When high, more high, and lifts us up when fallen./ This efficacious spirit chiefly lurks/ Among those passages of life that give/ Profoundest knowledge to what point, and how,/ The mind is lord and master--outward sense/  The obedient servant of her will. Such moments/ Are scattered everywhere, taking their date/ From our first childhood."The language Wordsworth uses within this excerpt suggests that he has had many 'spots of time' that he could draw upon from his memory that could give him strength as they release to him a sense of epiphany in his new realisation of seeing the world in a recollection of youth.

Notable Authors that use epiphanies 
The use of epiphanies as a stylistic and structural device in narrative and poetry came to prominence in the Romantic era. It was a popular literary device of the modernist author.

 Dubliners, by James Joyce
 A Portrait of the Artist as a Young Man, by James Joyce
 The Prelude, by William Wordsworth
 Virginia Woolf
 Joseph Conrad
 Marcel Proust
 William Faulkner
 Katherine Mansfield
 Samual Taylor Coleridge
 Percy Shelley
 John Keats
 Robert Browning
 William Butler Yeats
 Charles Baudelaire
 Arthur Rimbaud
 Ezra Pound

References 

Literature